The DoubleTree by Hilton Hotel Los Angeles Downtown is located in Los Angeles, California, USA. Managed by Rim Hospitality Inc., the hotel is located in the Little Tokyo area of downtown Los Angeles at 120 South Los Angeles Street.

The hotel was constructed by the Tokyo-based Kajima Corporation and designed by Japanese-American architect Hayahiko Takase. It opened in 1977 as the New Otani Hotel & Garden. It was sold to 3D Investments in August 2007, who brought in Crestline Hotels & Resorts to manage the property, which was renamed the Kyoto Grand Hotel and Gardens on November 30, 2007. Following bankruptcy proceedings, the Kyoto Grand was again rebranded as a DoubleTree by Hilton in July 2012, following renovations.

The hotel features 434 guest rooms on 21 floors with three restaurants: Garden Grill, Thousand Cranes, and the Azalea.
Popular with Japanese tourists, the hotel is known for its half-acre rooftop garden inspired by an ancient garden in Japan.

In 2011 electronic producer Skrillex named a song on his new EP Bangarang "Kyoto" because he produced the whole song on his notebook in one of the hotel rooms and even recorded the vocals there.

References

External links
Official site

Hotels in Los Angeles
DoubleTree hotels
Little Tokyo, Los Angeles
Hotels established in 1977
Hotel buildings completed in 1977
1977 establishments in California